Heath Freeman (June 23, 1980 – November 14, 2021) was an American actor. He was known for playing the role of Gavin Dillon in the American legal drama television series Raising the Bar, as well as roles on Bones (as the serial killer Howard Epps), NCIS, and Skateland. 

Freeman died of combined drug intoxication in November 2021, at the age of 41.

Filmography

Television

References

External links 

Rotten Tomatoes profile

1980 births
2021 deaths
Place of birth missing
Place of death missing
21st-century American male actors
American male film actors
American male television actors
University of Texas alumni